William J. Schaff Jr. is an artist and musician based in Warren, Rhode Island and Oakland, California. He is known for artwork for the bands Okkervil River, Songs: Ohia, Godspeed You! Black Emperor, and The Mighty Mighty Bosstones.

Art
Much of Schaff's art deals with death and loss, as well as the consequences of, and responses to, human violence. Stories from the Old Testament and scenes from The Holocaust are recurrent in his art.  Schaff works in paintings, drawings, collages, scratchboards, mail art, motion pictures, and comics.
 
A graduate of the Maryland Institute College of Art, Schaff has exhibited and lectured at numerous institutions, including the United States Air Force Academy, the Rhode Island School of Design, Amherst College, and East Carolina University.

Music-related art
Schaff is a prolific artist for musicians and is best known for producing all the art for the Jagjaguwar releases of Okkervil River. In 2009, he was the subject of Pitchfork's "Take Cover" feature, which discusses notable album art. In 2012, a book of Schaff's artwork, featuring introductions by John Darnielle of The Mountain Goats, Will Sheff of Okkervil River, and Darren Jackson of Kid Dakota, was published by Graveface Records. It includes a vinyl recording of previously unreleased songs by Jason Molina.

Art discography
 2021: Halfgrass, Raw Hackles
 2021: Viking Jesus, Before the Mutation
 2021: Zeb Gould, Destroyer Deliver
 2020: Jason Molina, Eight Gates
 2019: Stone Irr, Performance
 2019: Strand of Oaks, map insert for Pope Kildragon reissue
 2018: M. Lockwood Porter, Communion in the Ashes
 2018: Okkervil River, vinyl label decals for In the Rainbow Rain
 2018: Goshen Electric Co., The Gray Tower/Ring the Bell 7"
 2017: Waxahatchee/Kevin Morby, Farewell Transmission/The Dark Don't Hide It 7"
 2017: The Low Cards, The Low Cards
 2017: Jason Molina, The Black Sabbath Covers 7"
 2017: Gian Luca & The Oak, Flowers Never Grown
 2017: Andrew Cohen & Light Coma, Unreality
 2016: What Cheer? Brigade, You Can't See Inside of Me
 2016: Tyler Daniel Bean, On Days Soon to Pass
 2016: The Casket Girls, Night Machines
 2016: Jason Molina, I'll Be Here in the Morning/Tower Song 7"
 2015: Brown Bird, Axis Mundi
 2015: Heather Aubrey Lloyd, A Message in the Mess, Volume One EP
 2014: Swearing at Motorists, While Laughing, the Joker Tells the Truth
 2014: Okkervil River, The Silver Gymnasium
 2014: O'Death, Out of Hands We Go
 2014: The Wooly Moon, The Mountain 7"
 2014: Guy Capecelatro III, Scatter the Remains
 2013: Allysen Callery, Mumblin' Sue
 2013: Junior Varsity Arson, Waiver
 2013: Six Star General, Hair Supply
 2013: Assembly of Light Choir, Assembly of Light Choir
 2013: The Casket Girls, The Casket Girls EP
 2013: Brown Bird, Fits of Reason
 2013: Dan Baker, Pistol in My Pocket
 2012: John 3:16, Visions of the Hereafter - Visions of Heaven, Hell and Purgatory
 2012: Our Orthodox, We Are Not the Only Ones
 2012: Brown Bird/Joe Fletcher, I Love You and I Miss You (Dan Blakeslee tribute album)
 2011: Okkervil River, Your Past Life As a Blast 7"
 2011: Okkervil River, Rider 7"
 2011: Okkervil River, Wake and Be Fine 7"
 2011: Brown Bird, Salt for Salt
 2011: Okkervil River, Mermaid 12"
 2011: Kid Dakota, Listen To The Crows As They Take Flight
 2011: Okkervil River, I Am Very Far
 2010: Our Orthodox, Our Orthodox
 2010: Monster Movie, Everyone Is a Ghost
 2010: Dreamend, So I Ate Myself, Bite By Bite
 2009: The Mighty Mighty Bosstones, Pin Points and Gin Joints
 2008: Okkervil River, Lost Coastlines 7"
 2008: Kid Dakota, A Winner's Shadow
 2008: Okkervil River, The Stand Ins
 2007: Okkervil River, The Stage Names
 2006: Okkervil River, Overboard & Down EP
 2006: Monster Movie, All Lost
 2005: Okkervil River, Black Sheep Boy Appendix
 2005: Dreamend, Maybe We're Making God Sad and Lonely
 2005: Okkervil River, For Real (There's Nothing Quite Like the Blinding Light)
 2005: Okkervil River, Black Sheep Boy
 2004: Gravenhurst, Black Holes in the Sand
 2004: Kid Dakota, The West Is the Future
 2004: Sharron Kraus, Songs of Love and Loss
 2003: Songs: Ohia, The Magnolia Electric Co.
 2003: Gravenhurst, Flashlight Seasons
 2003: Kitchen Cynics, Parallel Dog Days
 2003: Kid Dakota, Get Her Out of My Heart 7"
 2003: Alec K. Redfearn and the Eyesores, Every Man for Himself and God Against All
 2003: Okkervil River, Down the River of Golden Dreams
 2002: Alec K. Redfearn and the Eyesores, Bent at the Waist
 2002: Okkervil River, Don't Fall in Love with Everyone You See
 2000: Godspeed You! Black Emperor, Lift Your Skinny Fists Like Antennas to Heaven
 1999: Alec K. Redfearn and the Eyesores, May You Dine on Weeds Made Bitter by the Piss of Drunkards

Music
Schaff led two acts as vocalist and songwriter, Reformation and Noel the Coward, and was part of the musical ensemble I Love You and I Miss You. He also played guitar and percussion with The Eyesores, The Iditarod, and Black Forest/Black Sea. Most recently, he was the drumming ape "Dead Chop Chop" in the What Cheer? Brigade.

Fort Foreclosure
Schaff lives and works in a house that was passed to him by his father, but does not own it outright, and due to unsteady income, has been unable to consistently make payments.  As a result, the house has been in foreclosure multiple times and has been nicknamed "Fort Foreclosure" by Schaff and its other residents.  In an attempt to raise funds to solve the problem, Schaff launched a partially-successful Indiegogo fundraising campaign in March 2014.

References

External links
The Artwork of William Schaff.
What Cheer? Marching Band.
.
.
"About the Artist: William Schaff" from Austin Chronicle.
"William Schaff - Lift Yr Skinny Fists" an interview in Stylus Magazine
"Under the Covers" from Stylus Magazine
"Unsettling Images/Artist's Images of Holocaust Horror Aim to Arouse" from The Gazette (Colorado Springs).
"An Electric Turn with Literary Pop" Schaff's cover art for Okkervil River discussed in a Boston Globe article.
"Take Cover: Will Schaff". December 2009 interview with Schaff on Pitchfork Media.
Noisey/Vice profile - June 2016

East Carolina University people
American artists
Living people
Year of birth missing (living people)
Artists from Rhode Island